Mantoloking is a borough in Ocean County, New Jersey, United States. As of the 2010 United States Census, the borough had a total population of 296, reflecting a decline of 127 (−30.0%) from the 423 counted in the 2000 Census, which had in turn increased by 89 (+26.6%) from the 334 counted in the 1990 Census. The borough has an estimated summer population of approximately 5,000.

As of the 2000 Census, Mantoloking was the highest-income community in the state of New Jersey with a per capita money income of $114,017 as of 1999, an increase of 29.8% from the $87,830 recorded in 1989. Based on data from the 2006–2010 American Community Survey, the borough had a per-capita income of $97,938, ranked 4th in the state. In the Forbes magazine 2012 rankings of "America's Most Expensive ZIP Codes", the borough was ranked 139th, with a median price of $1,403,349.

Mantoloking was incorporated as a borough by an act of the New Jersey Legislature on April 10, 1911, from portions of Brick Township. The name Mantoloking is derived from the Unami language of the Lenni Lenape Native Americans who once inhabited New Jersey. Various meanings have been attributed to the community's name including "frog ground" or "sand place".

The borough is a Jersey Shore community situated on the Barnegat Peninsula, also known as Barnegat Bay Island, a long, narrow barrier island that separates Barnegat Bay from the Atlantic Ocean.  The town is linked to the New Jersey-mainland via the Mantoloking Bridge, linking the town with Brick Township across the Barnegat Bay.  Mantoloking is home to the Olympic-champion producing Mantoloking Yacht Club. Some old "summer cottages" in the borough were designed by architect Stanford White of McKim, Mead & White. Together with Bay Head to the north, Mantoloking is considered part of the Jersey Shore's "Gold Coast". It is a dry town where alcohol is not permitted to be sold by law.

History

Impact of Hurricane Sandy

During Hurricane Sandy in 2012, storm surge damaged about 90% of the properties in Mantoloking with the largest damage occurring when a breach was formed between the Barnegat Bay and the Atlantic Ocean in the vicinity of Herbert Street (CR 528).

When Hurricane Sandy made landfall in New Jersey on October 29, 2012, the effects were severe, and Mantoloking was especially hard hit, with more than 50 homes requiring demolition, accounting for almost 10% of the housing units in the borough as of the 2010 Census. Verizon Communications announced in July 2013 that it won't rebuild its copper-wire based plain old telephone service to Mantoloking residents, instead providing them with its Voice Link wireless service, an effort that brought protests from the AARP. Residents have complained that many calls don't go through when dialed, that fax transmissions cannot be made, that 911 calls may be affected by network bottlenecks and that power outages would result in the loss of service.

Geography

According to the United States Census Bureau, the borough had a total area of 0.64 square miles (1.66 km2), including 0.39 square miles (1.00 km2) of land and 0.25 square miles (0.66 km2) of water (39.69%).

The borough borders the Ocean County municipalities of Bay Head, Brick Township and Point Pleasant.

Demographics

Census 2010

The Census Bureau's 2006–2010 American Community Survey showed that (in 2010 inflation-adjusted dollars) median household income was $151,667 (with a margin of error of +/− $66,768) and the median family income was $200,833 (+/− $146,466). Males had a median income of $98,333 (+/− $210,103) versus $42,917 (+/− $32,621) for females. The per capita income for the borough was $97,938 (+/− $40,847). About none of families and none of the population were below the poverty line, including none of those under age 18 and none of those age 65 or over.

Census 2000

As of the 2000 United States Census there were 423 people, 207 households, and 140 families residing in the borough. The racial makeup of the borough was 97.64% White, 1.65% African American, 0.47% Asian, 0.24% from other races. Hispanic or Latino of any race were 0.71% of the population.

There were 207 households, out of which 11.6% had children under the age of 18 living with them, 62.8% were married couples living together, 3.4% had a female householder with no husband present, and 31.9% were non-families. 30.4% of all households were made up of individuals, and 16.9% had someone living alone who was 65 years of age or older. The average household size was 2.02 and the average family size was 2.45.

In the borough the population was spread out, with 10.2% under the age of 18, 3.8% from 18 to 24, 10.6% from 25 to 44, 39.2% from 45 to 64, and 36.2% who were 65 years of age or older. The median age was 58 years. For every 100 females, there were 96.7 males. For every 100 females age 18 and over, there were 91.0 males.

The median income for a household in the borough was $105,841, and the median income for a family was $125,000. Males had a median income of $100,000 versus $64,167 for females. The per capita income for the borough was $114,017. None of the families and 0.8% of the population were living below the poverty line, including no under eighteens and 2.2% of those over 64.

Government

Local government
Mantoloking is governed under the Borough form of New Jersey municipal government, one of 218 municipalities (of the 564) statewide, making it the most common form of government in New Jersey. The governing body is comprised of the Mayor and the Borough Council, with all positions elected at-large on a partisan basis as part of the November general election. The Mayor is elected directly by the voters to a four-year term of office. The Borough Council is comprised of six members elected to serve three-year terms on a staggered basis, with two seats coming up for election each year in a three-year cycle. The Borough form of government used by Mantoloking is a "weak mayor / strong council" government in which council members act as the legislative body with the mayor presiding at meetings and voting only in the event of a tie. The mayor can veto ordinances subject to an override by a two-thirds majority vote of the council. The mayor makes committee and liaison assignments for council members, and most appointments are made by the mayor with the advice and consent of the council.

, the Mayor of Mantoloking is Republican E. Laurence "Lance" White III, whose term of office ends on December 31, 2022. Members of the Borough Council are Council President Lynn O'Mealia (R, 2022), Anthony M. Amarante (R, 2023), F. Bradford Batcha (R, 2024), Barbara Hood Benz (R, 2022), John Conti (R, 2024) and Douglas Nelson (R, 2023) -- D'Arcy Green (R, 2022).

The Borough Council appointed Barbara Benz in January 2021 to fill the seat expiring in December 2022 that was vacated by D’Arcy Green. Benz served on an interim basis until the November 2021 general election when she was elected to serve the remainder of the term of office.

In December 2018, Donald Ness was selected by the Borough Council to fill the seat expiring in December 2019 that became vacant following the resignation of Lynn O'Mealia earlier that month.

In 2018, the borough had an average property tax bill of $17,762, the highest in the county, compared to an average bill of $8,767 statewide.

Federal, state, and county representation
Mantoloking is located in the 4th Congressional District and is part of New Jersey's 10th state legislative district. 

 

Ocean County is governed by a Board of County Commissioners comprised of five members who are elected on an at-large basis in partisan elections and serving staggered three-year terms of office, with either one or two seats coming up for election each year as part of the November general election. At an annual reorganization held in the beginning of January, the board chooses a Director and a Deputy Director from among its members. , Ocean County's Commissioners (with party affiliation, term-end year and residence) are:

Commissioner Director John P. Kelly (R, 2022, Eagleswood Township),
Commissioner Deputy Director Virginia E. Haines (R, 2022, Toms River),
Barbara Jo Crea (R, 2024, Little Egg Harbor Township)
Gary Quinn (R, 2024, Lacey Township) and
Joseph H. Vicari (R, 2023, Toms River). Constitutional officers elected on a countywide basis are 
County Clerk Scott M. Colabella (R, 2025, Barnegat Light),
Sheriff Michael G. Mastronardy (R, 2022; Toms River) and
Surrogate Jeffrey Moran (R, 2023, Beachwood).

Politics
As of March 23, 2011, there were a total of 324 registered voters in Mantoloking, of which 23 (7.1%) were registered as Democrats, 247 (76.2%) were registered as Republicans and 54 (16.7%) were registered as Unaffiliated. There were no voters registered to other parties. Among the borough's 2010 Census population, 109.5% (vs. 63.2% in Ocean County) were registered to vote, including 114.1% of those ages 18 and over (vs. 82.6% countywide).

Mantoloking is one of the most consistently Republican jurisdictions in the state of New Jersey. After New Jersey native Woodrow Wilson carried the borough in its inaugural election, no Democratic presidential candidate has done so again.  Even as New Jersey has trended Democratic since the 1990's, Mantoloking has remained largely Republican, with 2016 and 2020 Republican nominee and president Donald Trump carrying the borough by over 25 points in both of his campaigns. Prior to Trump, all of the preceding 21 Republican nominees for president from Herbert Hoover in 1932 to Mitt Romney in 2012 won Mantoloking by a margin of at least 50 points, with 14 of them earning 80% of the vote, and Thomas Dewey in 1948, Dwight Eisenhower in 1956, and Richard Nixon in 1960 and 1972 each winning 90% of the vote.

In the 2013 gubernatorial election, Republican Chris Christie received 92.7% of the vote (152 cast), ahead of Democrat Barbara Buono with 7.3% (12 votes), and other candidates receiving no votes, among the 165 ballots cast by the borough's 307 registered voters (1 ballot was spoiled), for a turnout of 53.7%. In the 2009 gubernatorial election, Republican Chris Christie received 80.9% of the vote (174 ballots cast), ahead of Democrat Jon Corzine with 12.1% (26 votes), Independent Chris Daggett with 6.0% (13 votes) and other candidates with 0.5% (1 votes), among the 215 ballots cast by the borough's 336 registered voters, yielding a 64.0% turnout.

Education

Students in Mantoloking attend public school in Point Pleasant Beach for kindergarten through twelfth grade as part of a sending/receiving relationship with the Point Pleasant Beach School District, together with students from Bay Head and Lavallette who attend the district's high school as part of sending/receiving relationships. As of the 2018–2019 school year, the district, comprised of two schools, had an enrollment of 763 students and 78.3 classroom teachers (on an FTE basis), for a student–teacher ratio of 9.7:1. Schools in the district (with 2018–2019 enrollment data from the National Center for Education Statistics) are 
G. Harold Antrim Elementary School 384 students in grades Pre-K–8 and 
Point Pleasant Beach High School 367 students in grades 9–12.

Transportation

New Jersey Route 35 and County Route 528 are the main highways serving Mantoloking. Route 35 traverses the borough north to south, parallel to the coast, while CR 528 begins at Route 35 and heads west across Barnegat Bay to the mainland.

Public transportation
NJ Transit trains terminate at the Bay Head station and yard, 1.5 miles north of Mantoloking's northern border, with service on the North Jersey Coast Line north to Penn Station Newark and Penn Station New York in Midtown Manhattan.

Climate

According to the Köppen climate classification system, Mantoloking, New Jersey has a humid subtropical climate (Cfa). Cfa climates are characterized by all months having an average mean temperature > 32.0 °F (> 0.0 °C), at least four months with an average mean temperature ≥ 50.0 °F (≥ 10.0 °C), at least one month with an average mean temperature ≥ 71.6 °F (≥ 22.0 °C) and no significant precipitation difference between seasons. During the summer months at Mantoloking, a cooling afternoon sea breeze is present on most days, but episodes of extreme heat and humidity can occur with heat index values ≥ 95 °F (≥ 35 °C). On average, the wettest month of the year is July which corresponds with the annual peak in thunderstorm activity. During the winter months, episodes of extreme cold and wind can occur with wind chill values < 0 °F (< −18 °C). The plant hardiness zone at Mantoloking Beach is 7a with an average annual extreme minimum air temperature of 3.5 °F (−15.8 °C).

Ecology
According to the A. W. Kuchler U.S. potential natural vegetation types, Mantoloking, New Jersey would have a dominant vegetation type of Northern Cordgrass (73) with a dominant vegetation form of Coastal Prairie (20).

Notable people

People who were born in, residents of, or otherwise closely associated with Mantoloking include:

 Dr. Britton Chance (1913–2010), Eldridge Reeves Johnson University Professor Emeritus of Biochemistry and Biophysics, who won a gold medal in sailing at the 1952 Summer Olympics in Helsinki along with fellow Mantoloking sailors, Edgar White and his twin brother Sumner
 Britton Chance Jr. (1940–2012), yacht designer
 Donald DiFrancesco (born 1944), former Acting Governor of the State of New Jersey and former President of the New Jersey State Senate, who spends summers here with his family
 Guy Gabrielson (1891–1976), politician who served as chairman of the Republican National Committee from 1949 to 1952, and was a member of the New Jersey General Assembly from 1925 to 1929
 James Gandolfini (1961–2013), actor who summered in Mantoloking, both in his childhood and as an adult
 Laura Barney Harding (1902–1992), long time friend of Katharine Hepburn (1907–2003), owned a summer home on the Mantoloking oceanfront. Due to a long visit of Hepburn, people referred to it as Hepburn's house
 Robert J. Morris (1915–1997), anti-Communist activist, U.S. Senate candidate, President of the University of Dallas, founder of the University of Plano, founder of the Defenders of American Liberties and lecturer
 Richard Nixon (1913–1994), former Vice President and President of the United States of America who summered here when he was Vice President
 Jan O'Malley (born 1946), sailor who was named US Sailor of the Year three times
 Edgar White  (1929–2014), sailor and Olympic champion at the 1952 Summer Olympics in Helsinki with Britton Chance and his twin brother Sumner
 Sumner White (1929–1988), sailor and Olympic champion at the 1952 Summer Olympics in Helsinki with Britton Chance and his twin brother Edgar

References

External links

 Mantoloking borough website
 Point Pleasant Beach School District
 
 School Data for the Point Pleasant Beach School District, National Center for Education Statistics

 
1911 establishments in New Jersey
Borough form of New Jersey government
Boroughs in Ocean County, New Jersey
Jersey Shore communities in Ocean County
New Jersey District Factor Group none
Populated places established in 1911